Dana Turner Coons Thiele (born September 27, 1978 in Fairfax County, Virginia) is an American long distance runner.  She is a two-time qualifier for the US Olympic Trials (10,000m in 2004, marathon in 2008), and in 2007 was ranked 16th in the country for the marathon with a time of 2:38:18.  In the 2008 Olympic Marathon trials in Boston, Coons finished 30th in a time of 2:41:31.  Her twin brother, Jason Turner Coons, played club lacrosse at James Madison University.

Running career

High school
Coons attended James Madison High School, where she graduated in 1997. While running during high school she was a two-time district champion in the 1,600 meters (as a sophomore and as a junior) as well as district champion in cross country and on the track in the 3,200 meters as a junior.

Collegiate
Coons went to college at the University of Virginia, where she was a fine arts major.  During her fourth and final year, she won the ACC title at 10,000m, and was an NCAA qualifier at that distance.  Upon graduating from UVA, Coons spent two years in Charlottesville, VA as an assistant coach at UVA, and during that time she lowered her 10,000m personal best to 33:07 (Cardinal Invitational, 2003).

Post-collegiate
In September 2003, Coons moved to Minneapolis, MN to train with Team USA Minnesota, where she trained under coach Dennis Barker with Carrie Tollefson, Katie McGregor, and other elite athletes.  It was during this time that she moved up to the marathon - she debuted in the Twin Cities Marathon, running 2:46:54 in October, 2005.  After spending two years with Team USA Minnesota, she then moved back to Charlottesville. One year later, she lowered her personal best to 2:38:18, at the 2006 Chicago Marathon. She helped found, and coaches for Ragged Mountain Racing, a post-collegiate training team based in Charlottesville, Virginia and modeled after Team USA Minnesota.

Personal life
Coons was married to Dr. Robert Thiele on June 7, 2008 in Madison County, Virginia.  Thiele is a former runner at the University of Virginia.  Thiele is also a former neurosurgery resident who recently switched into anesthesiology.  The couple resides in Charlottesville, VA.

References

1978 births
American female long-distance runners
Living people
Virginia Cavaliers women's track and field athletes
21st-century American women